Atel may refer to:

 Atel people, an ethnic group in Laos
 Ațel, a commune in Romania
 ATel, The Astronomer's Telegram, an astronomical internet service
 Atel (slang), a Bengali pejorative term

See also
 Attel
 Attell